Events in the year 2023 in Bosnia and Herzegovina.

Incumbents 

 President: Denis Bećirović, Željka Cvijanović, Željko Komšić
 Prime Minister: Zoran Tegeltija (until 25 January); Borjana Krišto onwards

Events 
Ongoing – COVID-19 pandemic in Bosnia and Herzegovina

Sports 

 15 July 2022 – 28 May 2023: 2022–23 Premier League of Bosnia and Herzegovina
 30 September 2022 – 16 April 2023: 2022–23 ABA League First Division
 2022–23 Bosnia and Herzegovina Football Cup

References 

 
2020s in Bosnia and Herzegovina
Years of the 21st century in Bosnia and Herzegovina
Bosnia and Herzegovina
Bosnia and Herzegovina